Best Behaviour may refer to:

"Best Behaviour" (N-Dubz song), 2010
"Best Behaviour" (Louisa Johnson song), 2017